Fortun is a village in Luster Municipality in Vestland county, Norway. The village is located in the Fortundalen valley, just east of Skjolden, at the innermost part of the Lustrafjorden. The Sognefjellsvegen road passes through the village. Fortun is an old church site, having a stave church on the site since the 12th century. The present Fortun Church was built in 1879 in the village, and it serves the eastern part of the municipality.  The Hurrungane mountains lie just to the south of the village. The area is known for its scenery and attracts many tourists.

References

Villages in Vestland
Luster, Norway